Ages of consent in Latin America may refer to:

Ages of consent in Mexico (North America)
Ages of consent in North America
Ages of consent in South America